On Pre-Islamic Poetry is a book of literary criticism published in 1926 by the Egyptian author Taha Hussein.  In it, Hussein argued that some pre-Islamic poetry was inauthentic, and cast doubt on the authenticity of the Quran.  The book's publication caused a major literary controversy in Egypt.

Contents
In the work, Hussein examines the canon of pre-Islamic poetry according to scientific principles.  He concluded that some portions of the text of the Quran are inauthentic, and that some pre-Islamic poetry is a later forgery. As he put it, "the conclusion I reached was that the general mass of what we call pre-Islamic literature had nothing whatever to do with the pre-Islamic period, but was just simply fabricated after the coming of Islam. It is therefore Islamic, and represents the life, the inclination, the desires of Muslims, rather than the life of pre-Islamic Arabs." He criticized the story of Abraham and Ishmael specifically, arguing that the story of them building the Ka'bah was invented in order to serve the interests of the Quraish tribe.  In the English-speaking world, the Orientalist scholar D. S. Margoliouth published similar views at about the same time in his article "The Origins of Arabic Poetry."

Reception
The publication of the book launched one of the two major controversies of Egyptian intellectual life in the 1920s. It had to be withdrawn and re-issued under the title On Pre-Islamic Literature in 1927, with the portions on the Quran removed. Because of the reaction to the work, Prime Minister Ismail Sidky removed Hussein from his position as dean of the literature department of the University of Cairo in 1932.  Ahmed Lutfi el-Sayed, the head of the university, supported Hussein and refused to accept his resignation. Hussein regained his university post when the Wafd Party returned to power in 1936. At least five books were written in response to the work:
Mostafa Saadeq Al-Rafe'ie – 
Muhammad Loutfi Goumah – The Monitoring Comet
Sheikh Al-Azhar  - Critism of the Book On Pre-Islamic Poetry
 – Critism of the Book On Pre-Islamic Poetry
Muhammad Ahmed al-Ghamrawi – Analytical Critique of a Book on Pre-Islamic Literature

Today, the arguments of Hussein and Margoliouth are believed to have been superseded by new developments in the understanding of oral tradition, specifically the theory of oral-formulaic composition propounded by Milman Parry and Albert Lord.

Notes

References

Bibliography

Further reading

External links
Arabic text of On Pre-Islamic Literature (Hindawi)

1926 books
1926 non-fiction books
Books of literary criticism
Egyptian books
Books by Taha Hussein